The following is a list of aircraft production by Germany during World War II by type and year. Note that some figures may not be accurate, and it is not comprehensive. Aircraft variants of different roles are listed separately. Related types are listed next to each other; see RLM aircraft designation system for an explanation.

See also
German armored fighting vehicle production during World War II
List of World War II military aircraft of Germany
World War II aircraft production
Military production during World War II

References
Adapted From

Production
Economy of Nazi Germany